Flos is a genus of butterflies in the family Lycaenidae.

Flos may also refer to:

Flos (book), a 1225 book by Fibonacci
Flos Greig (1880–1958), Australian lawyer
František Flos (1864–1961), Czech novelist
The FLOS, Former Ladies of the Supremes, music group

See also
Flo (disambiguation)
Floss (disambiguation)